Tees Maar Khan (1963) is a Pakistani Punjabi film which stars Shirin, Allauddin and Sawan in the lead roles.

Production
Alauddin was introduced as a hero for the first time. It was the debut film of actress Shirin and for the director Haider Chaudhry.

Cast
Allauddin
Shirin
Sawan
Zeenat
Asif Jah
ChunChun
Zahoor 
M. Ajmal

Music
The composers of the music of this film were Manzoor Ashraf (two musicians named Master Manzoor and M. Ashraf). M. Ashraf later separated from Master Manzoor in the late 1960s, went solo and became quite a popular film music director in Pakistan until his death in 2007. The film songs are sung by Naseem Begum, Nazir Begum, Ahmad Rushdi, Shaukat Ali.

"Nimbuan da jora assan bage wichun toria"	Nazir Begum
"Pyar bina nain milde naan"...	 Nazir Begum
"Ni main noukar toon sarkar" ...	Ahmad Rushdi, Nazir Begum
Pagri sanbhal Chora...	 Shaukat Ali, Nazir Begum
 "We Channa tenoo teri Jatti da salam aey"..	Naseem Begum
 "Meri Jhanjhar chhan chhan chhanke"..	Naseem Begum

References

External links

1963 films
Punjabi-language Pakistani films
Pakistani musical films
1960s Punjabi-language films
1963 musical films